María Elena Enríquez Ruiz (born August 18, 1944), known as Helena Rojo, is a Mexican actress and model.

Biography
Born in Mexico City, Mexico, she began her career as a model in the 1961. Toward the end of the decade, she studied drama with renowned Mexican directors Carlos Ancira and José Luis Ibáñez, making her film debut in 1968 in the film  El club de los suicidas.  That same year, Rojo also appeared in her second film, Los amigos. She continued working as a model and appearing in small film roles in the late 1960s and early 1970s.

In 1969, she signed an exclusivity contract with Productora Cinematográfica Marte. Later, she began expanding her acting career into television and theater. In 1974, her first television role was the lead in the telenovela Extraño en su pueblo.

Rojo's cinematic career lad her to work with the most important Mexican film directors of the 1970s and 1980s, such as Felipe Cazals, Arturo Ripstein, Rafael Corkidi, Alberto Bojórquez, Marcela Fernández Violante and Jorge Fons.

She has worked with international talent, such as German director Werner Herzog and actor Klaus Kinski with a role in the film Aguirre, the Wrath of God. She also appeared in the film Foxtrot (1976), directed by Arturo Ripstein, and alongside actors Charlotte Rampling, Peter O'Toole and Max von Sydow.

In 2006, she appeared on the American dramedy series Ugly Betty, playing a mother who tries to steer her son away from the stepmother who has eyes for him on a "faux" telenovela that is watched on TV by the main character's family.

Filmography

Movies

Television

Theater performances

Mujeres de Ceniza (Women of ashes)
Dios mio hazme viuda por favor (God please make me a widow)
Las muchachas del club (The Club Girls)
Cuentas muertas (Dead accounts)
El cartero (The Mailman)
Bajo cero (Below zero)
10, el marido perfecto (10, The Perfect Husband)
Lecciones para casadas (Lectures for Married Women)
Se infiel y no mires con quien (Be Unfaithful with Whomever)
Cena de Matrimonios (Dinner with Married Couples)
Me enamoré de una bruja (I fell in love with a Witch)
La mujer del pelo rojo (The Redheaded Woman)
Pecado en la isla de las cabras (Sin on the Isle of Goats)
La Ronda de las Arpías (Song of the Harpies)
Una oferta inmoral (Indecent Proposal)
Yo miento, tú mientes, todos mentimos (I Lie, You Lie, We All Lie)

Ariel Awards

 Won - 1972 Best Supporting Actress Ariel Award from the Mexican Academy of Film, for her role in Fin de Fiesta
 Nominated - 1973 Best Actress Ariel Award from the Mexican Academy of Film, for her role in Los Cachorros
 Won - 1981 Best Actress Ariel Award from the Mexican Academy of Film,  for her role in Misterio
 Nominated - 1992 Best Actress Ariel Award from the Mexican Academy of Film,  for her role in Muerte Ciega

TVyNovelas Awards

 Nominated 1985 -  Best Leading Actress -  La Traición
 Nominated 1996 -  Best Leading Actress -  Retrato de Familia
 Won 1999 -  Best Leading Actress -  El privilegio de Amar
 Won 2001 - Best Senior Actress -  Abrázame muy Fuerte
 Won 2005 -  Best Antagonistic Actress -  Inocente de Ti
 Nominated 2006 - Best Senior Actress -  Peregrina
 Won 2007 - Best Senior Actress -  Mundo de Fieras
 Won 2009 - Best Senior Actress -  Cuidado con el ángel
 Nominated 2010 - Best Senior Actress - Corazón Salvaje
 Nominated 2013 - Best Senior Actress - Por ella soy Eva
 Nominated 2015 - Best Senior Actress - El Color de la Pasión
 Won 2017 - Best Senior Actress - La Candidata

References

External links

Alma Latina: Mexican Telenovela Database 
The Mexican Film Resource Page
History of the Ariel  at the Mexican Academy of Film.
El Ariel  at wikisource

1944 births
Living people
Mexican telenovela actresses
Mexican television actresses
Mexican film actresses
Mexican stage actresses
Mexican female models
Actresses from Mexico City
Ariel Award winners
Best Supporting Actress Ariel Award winners
20th-century Mexican actresses
21st-century Mexican actresses
People from Mexico City